Steve Owen is a fictional character from the BBC soap opera EastEnders, played by Martin Kemp. He first appeared onscreen from 28 December 1998 and remained in the series until 1 March 2002. Introduced by series producer Matthew Robinson, the character Steve was a shady businessman who originally came into Albert Square to buy the local Market Cellar club – which he then renovated and later renamed the E20. He soon became one of the show's primary villains when the character's first major storyline saw Steve murder his old flame Saskia Duncan (Deborah Sheridan-Taylor) during the opening night of his E20 nightclub on Valentine's Day 1999, after which he ended up framing his DJ employee Matthew Rose (Joe Absolom) for the crime. The eventual episode in which Matthew enacted revenge on Steve drew in outstanding viewing figures and brought a storyline that had gripped the nation to a close.

Afterwards, Steve embarked on a dangerous feud with his arch nemesis: Phil Mitchell (Steve McFadden). The ensuing conflict between them grew intensifying as Steve later became sworn enemies with Phil's best-friend-turned-hardman adversary, Dan Sullivan (Craig Fairbrass), which had continued to develop in the case of both Dan and Phil having respective connections to Steve's girlfriend and future wife: Mel Healy (Tamzin Outhwaite). Additionally, Steve contributed to his significant interaction with other members of the Mitchell family by establishing an antagonistic business partnership with Phil's brother Grant (Ross Kemp); sleeping with their younger sister Sam (Kim Medcalf); employing the siblings' cousin, Billy (Perry Fenwick), to work for him as his errand boy; clashing with Phil's adolescent godson Jamie (Jack Ryder); and sparking a quarrel with the family's matriarch, Peggy (Barbara Windsor), over his managing stake of her public house called The Queen Victoria.

In 2001, the character was involved in the "Who Shot Phil?" storyline when he became a prime suspect. The whodunit scenario began with Steve marrying Mel on the day of Phil's shooting and ultimately concluded with Dan kidnapping Mel for ransom against both Steve and Phil, after the pair had worked together to implicate Dan behind the shooting – even though the culprit was earlier revealed to be Phil's ex-girlfriend and Mel's closest companion: Lisa Shaw (Lucy Benjamin). Martin Kemp soon quit the series after his contract to the show had expired, and his final scenes were aired on 1 March 2002 – the first anniversary of both Steve's wedding and Phil's shooting. In that episode, Steve made a last-ditch attempt to settle his score with Phil by fleeing the country and starting anew in America with his and Lisa's infant daughter Louise — which triggered a fierce car chase between the two archenemies that ended with Steve being killed after he crashed his car and consequently died in a vehicle explosion, though not before he helped Phil save Louise in his last moments; the character's funeral aired on 11 March 2002 and his onscreen wife Mel later departed a month later on 12 April that year in light of Steve's death.

It was thereafter alleged that producers had intentionally killed-off Steve as "revenge" for Martin Kemp leaving the show to make the transition from the BBC to rival station ITV. Nevertheless, Kemp received multiple award nominations and victories for his critically-acclaimed portrayal of Steve Owen.

Storylines

Steve arrives in Walford in December 1998. He buys the Market Cellar club in the borough's local community, Albert Square, before renovating the premises and then renaming it the E20; Steve thereafter sets up his new club's opening date on Valentine's Day in the coming new year.

While making preparations for the opening night of his E20 nightclub, Steve romantically bonds with Mel Healy (Tamzin Outhwaite) — who had recently moved into the square. Their relationship becomes threatened, however, when Steve's former girlfriend Saskia Duncan (Deborah Sheridan-Taylor) unexpectedly turns up and tries to come between them on numerous occasions. She soon entraps Steve by sleeping with him and then making sure that Mel and everyone else knows about it. Steve later pays Saskia to leave Walford and never bother him again. On the opening night of his E20 nightclub, however, Saskia confronts Steve in his office and it soon alleges that she had previously aborted their unborn child because of him; with Steve clarifying in his argument with Saskia that he didn't want them to have a baby. Saskia, blaming Steve for her abortion, vows to make him suffer and attacks Steve after he is unable to get her out of the club. She hits Steve on the head with a champagne bottle and then tries to strangle him with his tie. Moments later, Steve's DJ employee Matthew Rose (Joe Absolom) walks in on the situation and attempts to help Steve – which only prompts Saskia to go for Matthew until Steve attempts to get her off him and she again proceeds to strangle him with his tie once more. On the verge of being strangled to death and in self-defence, Steve picks up a heavy marble ashtray and hits her over the head with it – killing her instantly. Matthew tries to call the police when it becomes clear to him and his boss that Saskia is dead, but Steve stops him and instead forces Matthew to cover-up her death by burying her body to Epping Forest.

For the next few months, Steve torments Matthew is his newfound resolve to keep his DJ employee in check regarding the event of Saskia's death. This continues when Saskia's corpse is discovered months later, and Matthew later confines to his girlfriend Teresa di Marco (Leila Birch) about the incident. They later attempt to abscond the country for a fresh start together, but Steve discovers their plan and catches up to them. The police are soon called in when Matthew, nervous and shaken about his witnessing to the crime, confesses to the police about the incident; he and Steve are later charged for murder and manslaughter in relation to Saskia's murder. In the build-up to their jointed trial, Steve and Matthew are both remanded in custody and they hostility grows from that point onwards. Steve also receives a number of visits from his sister Jackie (Race Davies) as well as updates on the E20 management from Teresa's brother Beppe (Michael Greco), who has gone into partnership with Steve after losing his job as a police officer, while Matthew gains support from local resident Mark Fowler (Todd Carty) over his innocence behind Saskia's murder. After Steve and Matthew each give their statements about the circumstances behind Saskia's death, the trial ends with the pair receiving different verdicts on the manslaughter charge after both are found not guilty of murder; Steve is fully acquitted from his manslaughter charge while Matthew is found guilty of manslaughter and later sentenced to seven years in prison. Steve later attempt to settle his freedom in the square once more, but he finds himself publicly ostracized around the community for framing Matthew behind the crime – up to the point when Matthew's friend Robbie Jackson (Dean Gaffney) constantly brands him a "murderer" while both Mark and his close friend, Dot Cotton (June Brown), lecture him for his supposed lack of responsibility. When Steve attempts to have a drink in The Queen Victoria public house and nearly all the pundits begin to turn on him, he confronts them for the way how they've been treating him and describes how he killed Saskia in self-defense and that Matthew was never meant to get involved in the first place. Beppe, who is one of the few people to stand by Steve following the latter's trial, promptly buys a drink for Steve as everyone begins to realize that Steve's murder of Saskia was really in self-defense. He was also to be involved in the who shot Phil as the shooter

In the events between Saskia's murder and his subsequent trial over her death, Steve instigates a conflict with two of the square's local hardmen called the "Mitchell Brothers" — up to the point where he gradually becomes archenemies with the eldest brother, Phil Mitchell (Steve McFadden), and constantly antagonizes his sibling Grant (Ross Kemp) in the course of their business partnership. In the latter case, Steve repeatedly clashes with Grant when the two work together with illegitimate businesswoman Annie Palmer (Nadia Sawalha) in her bid to carry out her expansion plans around the square; with Annie managing the businesses that her entrepreneurial father, George (Paul Moriarty), has assigned her to takeover on his behalf. As the trio begin managing the square's local gym, Steve infiltrates Grant and Annie by hiring staff without either of their consent. This continues when Grant throws out one of the guests for causing trouble, and it turns out that the troublemaker is one of Steve's visitors. Steve later attempts to have Grant fired for not taking his orders seriously, but Grant instead quits and the business ends up floundering – which causes Annie to leave the square for good and sell his remaining share of her ownership to Grant. Later on, Steve confronts Grant just as the latter is preparing to join Phil on a criminal job and declares that they have "unfinished business" over their broken partnership. In a sarcastic remark "Oh yeah, so we haven't?", Grant punches Steve before leaving to do the job with Phil. This would be the last time Steve sees Grant, as the latter's heist with Phil ends with the Mitchell Brothers driving their getaway car into the River Thames and Grant is presumed dead; he is later revealed to be alive and ends up leaving the country to Rio de Janeiro in Brazil with his daughter Courtney.

Following Grant's departure, Steve turns his attention to Phil for the management of his business. He later joins the Mitchell Brothers' younger sister, Sam (Danniella Westbrook), on a trip to Brighton with Mel alongside Mark and two other guests: Sam's ex-husband Ricky Butcher (Sid Owen) and his troublesome sister Janine (Charlie Brooks). During the trip, Steve seeks to reconcile with Mel even when she is set to marry Phil's stepson Ian Beale (Adam Woodyatt) after her relationship with Steve ended due to the Saskia impact. However, Mel soon recoups her relationship with Steve after she dumps Ian for discovering that he lied to her and the square about his little daughter Lucy (Casey Anne Rothery) dying of cancer when in actuality she had been fine all along.

During the Millennium Eve ceremony on New Year's Eve 1999, Steve is surprised to see Matthew in the midst of celebrations; Matthew's conviction has been quashed on appeal and because of his good behaviour over the course of his wrongful imprisonment. For the next month in early 2000, Steve grows paranoid when Matthew alleges that he intents to settle his score with his former boss for good. This eventually culminates with the two having a showdown on the week before the first anniversary of Saskia's death. Matthew confronts Steve and attempts to blackmail him into giving him £10,000 as compensation for what he put him through over the incident. Steve initially refuses, but seemingly relents after Matthew presents the extent of his work to get revenge on Steve as well as explaining all of its cover-up – thus ensuring that Steve cannot establish proof to anything that Matthew has done against him ever since they crossed paths on New Year's Eve 1999. Steve then brandishes a handgun and tries to intimidate Matthew, only to learn that the DJ employee had earlier removed all the bullets from his handgun. When Steve attempts to attack Matthew, he gets knocked out and held captive in his chair. Matthew then claims to have killed Saskia's sister Claudia Fielding (Romla Walker), to which Steve at first dismisses until he is later presented with evidence that appears to not only claim otherwise – but also implicates Steve behind the crime in the same manner as he previously entrapped Matthew as the perpetrator behind Saskia's death. As Steve breaks down over how the situation has caught up with him, Matthew proceeds to chuck petrol over him and threatens to incinerate him. It is at this point that Steve is reduced to a desperate, helpless wreck as he tries to reason with Matthew. His pleas, however, fall on deaf ears when Matthew refuses to listen to Steve and prepares to set fire to the E20 – even when Teresa and Jackie arrive to try and also reason with him. Matthew then drops the light on the petrol, but nothing happens apart from Steve screaming out in fear. Matthew then reveals to Steve that the "petrol" is actually water and that Claudia was never dead or even involved in his plan in the first place, as well as the fact that he just wanted to show Steve up for what he really is. With his revenge against Steve fulfilled, Matthew takes the £10,000 and leaves the E20 after bidding farewell to Teresa; he soon leaves the square and is never heard or seen ever again in Walford.

After enduring the full extent of Matthew's revenge, Steve becomes depressed and ends up getting himself addicted to drugs. He takes up the advice of Ricky and Janine's stepmother, Pat Butcher (Pam St Clement), to leave the square for a while to overcome his drug addiction. As Steve embarks on his temporary leave from the square, Jackie joins him after failing to mend her broken relationship with Beppe and Teresa's brother Gianni (Marc Bannerman); she does not return to Walford afterwards and is never seen again. By then, Mel has begun romancing Phil's best-friend and business partner Dan Sullivan (Craig Fairbrass). This soon ends, however, after Mel tells Phil that Dan had secretly reported him to the police for operating a motor scam with his stepfather Frank (Mike Reid) and their colleague Roy Evans (Tony Caunter). On the night after Phil swindled Dan's ownership of the Queen Vic, Steve returns to the square upon overcoming his addiction and witnesses Dan threatening Mel. He soon intervenes and threatens Dan, who then leaves just as Steve begins to comfort Mel over her ordeal. When the situation continues as Dan begins to harass Mel with threatening phone calls and even breaking into her house at one point, Steve summons Phil's cousin Billy (Perry Fenwick) and orders him to locate Dan's whereabouts; Billy had been working for Steve ever since Grant left the square and in Steve's bid to challenge Phil in their business competition. Billy soon learns where Dan is, and Steve goes to confront him in his flat. Dan is at first unfazed by Steve's threat into leaving Walford, but Steve changes his mind by brandishing his handgun and threatening to kill Dan unless he calls Mel to apologize; Dan complies and he seemingly leaves the square for good. Afterwards, Steve informs Mel that Dan has been taken care off and that he won't be bothering her again.

When Phil learns that Steve had forced Dan to leave the square, the two rivals call a truce and they later work together in some businesses around the square. Their potential friendship quickly reverts into a two-man feud when Phil persuades Beppe to sell him his share of the E20 club without Steve's consent. When Steve asserts that Mel is partly to blame after noticing the quality time she and Phil have been spending time together, he confronts her about it in the pub until Phil tells him to back off. When Steve dismisses his threats, Phil punches him and the two end up having a brutal fight that ends with Phil forcing Steve out of the pub and Steve promising retaliation. Steve later apologizes to Mel after Christmas Day 2000 and soon proposes to her, which she gladly accepts. However, Steve is unaware that Mel had a one-night stand with Phil on Christmas Day. They nevertheless begin planning their wedding in early 2001, which becomes further complicated when Dan returns to the square. Steve discovers this after finding Dan overpowering Billy in his office, and he orders Billy to leave before turning his attention to Dan. It is at this point that Steve and Dan have formed a rivalry in the ensuing course of their respective feuds with Phil himself. This is proven when Dan tells Steve that his reasons for coming back to square are to deal with Phil, to which Steve dismisses by reminding Dan of the last warning he gave him and again threatens him should he ever come in between him and Mel again. Dan then warns Steve to not let Mel "take him for a mug" just as she allegedly did to him and Ian, before offering him a handshake. Steve rejects this and threateningly tells Dan to get out of his office, which prompts Dan to tell Steve that he'll regret telling him that before leaving.

By the time Steve's wedding to Mel has emerged, his suspicions about her and Phil prompt him to secretly record a conversation between them – which Steve remotely overhears by using his phone. Steve's suspicions are eventually confirmed when Phil tells Mel to admit that she enjoyed sleeping with him, and she reluctantly responds to this as Steve listens through. On the day of their wedding, Steve becomes aggravated when Phil turns up uninvited and proceeds to woo Steve's mother Barbara (Sheila Hancock) — who herself has also turned up against Steve's expectations – by striking up a conversation with her. The situation escalates at the E20 reception, where Steve confronts Phil for getting his mother involved and Phil tauntingly mocks him in front of her and the remaining guests. Later on that night, local taxi driver Charlie Slater (Derek Martin) prepares to drive the newly-wedded couple to their honeymoon. As they begin to leave, Steve claims that he needs to check on Billy at the E20 and momentarily leaves Mel – though it becomes clear that Steve appears intent on getting revenge on Phil for the trouble he has caused him. This could've been a motive for Steve when Phil gets shot by an unseen assailant, shortly before Steve returns and proceeds to go to his holiday with Mel.

When the pair return from their honeymoon, they hear about Phil's shooting and Steve is promptly implicated as the prime suspect. It soon transpires that the weapon that hospitalized Phil was Steve's handgun, which has gone missing ever since the incident occurred just at the end of Steve and Mel's wedding. Steve is later arrested when police detective DCI Jill Marsden (Sophie Stanton) and her unit gather evidence of his implication, most notably his motive for knowing about Mel sleeping with Phil on Christmas 2000. Upon hearing of this, both Phil's mother Peggy (Barbara Windsor) and his young godson Jamie (Jack Ryder) constantly accuse Steve of committing the crime. Steve insistently proclaims his innocence behind Phil's shooting and ends up clashing with Jamie on multiple occasions; at this stage, Jamie has already grown to dislike Steve since he was recently Matthew's best-friend and had previously testified against Steve for Saskia's murder. Steve later visits Phil in the hospital and threatens him should he ever use Mel to his advantage in their feud again. Later that evening, Steve receives a visit from Dan and is again confronted by Jamie moments later. When Steve tauntingly tells Jamie that Phil is a liar, Jamie punches Steve and they fight when Steve punches Jamie back. Dan breaks up the fight just as Robbie's sister Sonia (Natalie Cassidy), who is also Jamie's girlfriend, intervenes as well. Jamie demands Steve to get out of the square for good, but Steve refuses and again protests his innocence. However, when Phil recovers and discharges himself from the hospital that night, Steve is indeed proven innocent when Phil ends up confronting the real culprit: his former girlfriend and Mel's best-friend, Lisa Shaw (Lucy Benjamin).

Shortly after confronting Lisa and forgiving her for shooting him, as Phil had driven her to it due to his mistreatment towards her since over a year ago, Phil resolves to implicate the crime on both Steve and Dan to rid himself of his two archenemies who each threaten his position as the square's reigning top dog. He initially plans to incriminate Steve after seeing him and Mel together in the pub, but then decides to frame Dan after the latter begins extorting money from him and Jamie. When Steve learns about this from Billy, he goes to visit Phil and witnesses him finishing his meeting with Dan's former crime boss Ritchie Stringer (Gareth Hunt). That afternoon, Steve begins to taunt Phil into leaving Walford after recalling on what Dan has been doing to him and Jamie. However, Steve's mood changes when Phil reveals that his handgun – which Lisa used to shoot Phil and had kept in possession in between after Steve's wedding and before Phil's recovery – is now in Ritchie's possession as part of his plan to frame Dan, whom Steve insists Phil incriminate after assuming that Phil intents to frame him for the crime. Phil soon plans to lure Steve to The Archies the following night, despite Mel's protests. Steve goes to meet Phil there anyway, but promptly leaves after witnessing Dan holding Phil at gunpoint. Moments later, the police arrive and arrest Dan under the suspicion of shooting Phil and unlawful possession of Steve's firearm. Dan is subsequently charged for the crime and Phil soon asks Steve to help him ensure that Dan would get sent down for the shooting; Steve agrees when it becomes clear that both he and Phil would both find themselves comfortable be well-ridden of their common nemesis, as well as Mel's previous lover and tormentor.

Before the events of Dan's trial, Mel alerts Steve that his mother expects a visit from him about her condition to her terminal heart disease. At first Steve doesn't want to visit Barbara and refuses to explain his reasons to Mel, but he eventually changes his mind after having a heart-to-heart with local neighbour Natalie Price (Lucy Speed) about their relationship progressions; with Natalie confining to Steve about how her past troubles have been overcome thanks to her marriage with Roy's only-son, Barry (Shaun Williamson). Afterwards, Steve visits his mother in her flat and it quickly becomes clear that she is in critical condition due to her terminal heart disease. It is then revealed that Barbara had previously abused Steve when he was a child, and that she never appeared to care for either him or Jackie. When Steve confronts her about her past behaviour, she sarcastically defends her actions by claiming that his late father Richard had left her to bring up him and Jackie with no money. Steve reluctantly goes to call an ambulance as his mother's condition appears to escalate, but she refuses and instead demands Steve give her a kiss. Steve call an ambulance and asks him to kiss her. He gives her a peck on the forehead but she asks for a kiss on the lips. When he leans forward, she grabs him and gives him an extremely passionate kiss, telling him he is an attractive man. Disgusted and traumatized, Steve furiously disowns his mother and leaves after calling her sick. Mel is later informed that Barbara has died and tells Steve about it, but he reacts indifferently and refuses to attend her funeral; Mel later ends up going to the funeral on her own. She subsequently confronts Steve for his callousness over his mother's death, but then sympathizes with her husband when he is forced to explain how his mother neglected and abused him during his childhood.

Following his mother's funeral, Steve proceeds to contribute with Phil's plot and gives false evidence in his own testimony against Dan; however, the plan ends unsuccessfully when Dan is found not guilty by the jury in his verdict. Dan is later released and, assuming that Steve was the one who shot Phil and that the pair have conspired to get him sent to prison, resolves to get revenge on his two arch-rivals.  His first act is to force Billy into giving him leverage over Steve and Phil. When Dan threatens to hurt Billy, the latter reluctantly exposes Phil's one-night stand with Mel and this causes Dan to realize that Mel is the link between Steve and Phil's rivalry. Dan later kidnaps Mel and proceeds to hold her ransom in an abandoned flat. When Steve learns about this from Dan in a taunting phone call, he alerts Phil and the two form an uneasy alliance to save Mel from their enemy. Soon enough, Dan contacts Steve and demands that both he and Phil deliver £100,000 each to him in exchange for Mel's safety – up to the point where he even threatens her life in a bid to get his two rivals to compel to his demand. After the pair manage to obtain the £200,000, Steve and Phil argue about who will be exchanging the money for Mel and whether Dan needs to be taken down – with Steve just wanting Mel to come home safe while Phil is determined to finish things with Dan to stop him from making lives harder for them as well as Jamie and Peggy themselves. Just as Steve goes to deliver the money, however, Dan calls Phil and orders him – not Steve – to make the exchange for Mel. In compliance, Phil takes the money and goes to the flat where Dan is holding Mel captive to make the exchange on his own. There, he momentarily disarms Dan and prepares to kill him; however, he fails when Dan ends up overpowering Phil after Mel causes a distraction. Dan then flees Walford with his £200,000 ransom money, but not after he drops Mel off near the square and she thereupon returns to Steve at his house.

Although Steve is relieved that Mel has been unharmed throughout her ordeal with Dan, she later confronts her husband about all the things that Dan told her while he was holding her captive; Mel had learned from Dan that Steve had cheated on her amid the events of his mother's funeral, as he slept with Karen – which Billy later found out about and was forced to tell Dan when the latter had extorted leverage from him against Steve and Phil. Furthermore, she discovers that Steve had secretly bought the pub from Phil's ex-lover Sharon Watts (Letitia Dean) without ever consulting to his wife about it. When Steve is unable to assert her suspicions, he is forced to admit his lies to Mel and the two get into a heated argument when she confronts him about it. Steve attempts to use his mother's death as an excuse, but Mel points out his callousness in reaction to her death and threatens to divorce him. She also accuses Steve of shooting Phil and framing Dan for the crime, having already realized that Dan was telling the truth about his innocence behind Phil's shooting. In his subsequent rebuttal, Steve tells Mel that she still owns half of the E20 and further states that he just bankrupted himself by paying Dan the ransom money he demanded from him and Phil. Later that evening, Steve approaches Phil to seek help with providing him by reinstating his share of The Queen Vic; Phil refuses and Steve promises that he will pay for crossing him before leaving the pub. At the same time, Mel goes to see Billy at the E20 to know more about Steve's affair with Karen. He unsuccessfully tries to vouch for Steve's innocence and ends up giving Mel an unintended contraction about her ownership of the E20. When she promptly questions Billy about this, Mel discovers from her husband's safe that Steve had actually settled earlier paperwork where he owns the entire nightclub – thus meaning that Steve had lied to his wife once again. Outraged by the extent of Steve's deception, Mel retaliates against her husband by burning down his club and then chucking her wedding ring at Steve; she then departs Walford to clear her mind over Steve's deceit and lies.

In light of Dan's revenge and Mel's departure, Steve ends up having financial problems; his insurance policy is invalidated due to the fact that he neglected to mention his involvement in both Saskia's death and a previous crime where he attempted to cut costs by illegally importing duty-free wines from France. To sort out his monetary difficulties, he organises a robbery to help finance the renovation of the club and arranges for some of old friends to partake in the job; Steve reluctantly invites Billy into the heist as well. After assembling his crew and making preparations, Steve plans to steal money from a wealthy businessman named Alan. During the heist, Steve attempts to trap Alan's mistress Jan Sherwood (Cherie Lunghi) and they end up having a one-night stand together; Steve and Jan split the money that was stolen, fooling Steve's gang into believing Jan had taken it all. Afterwards, Steve gives Billy his share from the job and tracks down Mel in his plan to win her back. This nearly fails as Mel begins to date Barry's half-brother Nathan Williams (Doug Allen) upon returning to Walford, but Steve successfully ends up wooing Mel.

It is at this point that Steve and Phil have escalated their own rivalry with each other. By the time 2002 has emerged, Steve infuriates Phil by pretending that he slept with Sharon while they were recouped their old relationship. Phil responds by attacking Steve and ends up getting arrested, up to the point where he is charged for assault. In retaliation, Phil forces Billy to plant drugs in Steve's club and Steve is in turn arrested – though he is released without charge. Steve then pays Jamie to smash the Queen Vic after learning that his companionship with Phil had deteriorated. Later on, Steve further antagonizes Phil by sleeping with Sam (now played by Kim Medcalf). When Phil learns about the heist Steve perpetuated a couple of months ago, he arranges for Steve to be confronted by the same people who he owes money to. Steve instead plans for him and Mel to leave Walford and start anew in the United States together. She agrees and the couple subsequently invite both Lisa and Mark, who have are now engaged ever since Lisa ended her relationship with Phil, to join them – before Steve later convinces Lisa to also take her and Phil's infant daughter, Louise (Rachel Cox), along with their trip.

On the day of the first anniversary to both Steve's wedding and Phil's shooting, trouble emerges when Mark is unable to go due to his HIV condition and Lisa believes the plan is falling apart. When Steve plans to tie-up his loose ends to put his escape plan into motion, he convinces Mel to look after Lisa while he heads off. However, Phil soon discovers the plan and calls Steve to demand that he return Louise to him; Steve refuses and taunts Phil before hanging up. After confronting Mel over her ex-husband's whereabouts, Phil catches up to Steve and the two engage in an intense vehicular car chase that ends with Steve – just as he attempts to answer Mel's phone call – crashing into a wall after a tire bursts from his car, which ends up colliding into a parked motorbike; this instantly totals his car and triggers a fire. When Phil arrives in that moment, Steve helps him rescue Louise by passing the baby to Phil – who then rushes her to safety just as Steve finds himself unable to get out of the car. Steve then repeatedly calls Phil out to save him when it becomes clear that his car is about to explode. Phil eventually relents after a moment of hesitation and he begins to rush back to save Steve from his burning car, but it was too late as the vehicle suddenly explodes in a fireball – killing Steve as a result; Phil, having failed to reach Steve in time, is forced to watch the explosion occur before he takes Louise back to the Square and Steve's reign of terror at Walford is finally over.

During her offscreen time away from Walford, Mel ends up giving birth to Steve's child – which turns out to be a boy and she thereupon names her son Hunter. Over a decade later in 2018, Hunter (played by Charlie Winter) is introduced to Walford when Mel returns to the square with him. It turns out, however, that Hunter has similar tendencies to his father. However, he soon discovers the truth about the extent of his father's infamous reputation from Mel's mob boss Ciara Maguire (Denise McCormack) after she ends up colluding with Phil against Ciara's ex-husband Aidan (Patrick Bergin). Soon enough, Hunter ends up dating Louise (now played by Tilly Keeper) and their relationship leads him to discover the events behind their own father's car chase; Phil later describes the events of Steve's death to Hunter, who soon resolves to helping Mel reopen the E20 in tribute to the father that he never got to know about. In 2019, Steve's first and last crimes are separately recounted when Hunter kills Mel's new husband Ray Kelly (Sean Mahon) for trying to murder her – which sparks the events of his arrest and subsequent death when he commits a siege at the Queen Vic whilst seeking revenge on his mother's subsequent fiancée, Jack Branning (Scott Maslen), for being involved in his own imprisonment; Hunter's siege results in him shooting Louise's brother Ben (Max Bowden) and then her boyfriend Keanu Taylor (Danny Walters), before he then nearly shoots Louise until he is fatally gunned down by a marked policeman. Two months later after her son's death, Mel ends up getting killed in a road collision at the climax of her car chase with Sharon – who was married to Phil throughout that point. Ironically, Mel's death mirrors Steve's own demise from his car chase with Phil 17 years prior.

Development

Relationship with Mel Healy
In an interview in June 2000, Kemp discussed the relationship between Steve and Mel: "Steve's convinced Mel will make his life complete. She kept him going during all the bad times and now he's determined to have her. It's true of a lot of guys who get into trouble, they hang their hat on one idea and that keeps them sane [...] there's a driving force that kept them going while they were [in prison]. And often that's a woman. You know from those tender moments when Mel came to visit Steve [in prison] that she was the thing that kept him going, and he won't stop til he gets her back." Eventually the couple were shown to marry in the soap in March 2001, despite a revelation that Mel had strayed with Steve's nemesis Phil Mitchell (Steve McFadden). Tamzin Outhwaite explained, "With Ian, Mel was the one who didn't want to go through with it. This time around Mel is the one who is apprehensive, hoping Steve will be there for her. If he isn't, she has no reason to stay in Walford. This really is make or break time for her." The wedding night was a precursor to one of the soap's most publicised storylines, Who Shot Phil?, where Phil was gunned down by an unknown assailant and, due to Mel's infidelity, Steve became one of the prime suspects for the murder attempt, though he transpired to be a red herring. Discussing Mel and Steve's wedding, Outhwaite said, "Even though this wedding with Steve has got as much controversy as Mel's last one [with Ian], it feels more true. The characters seem more suited and it's not a big, white wedding, it's a low-key register office thing." 17 million viewers watched the wedding.

In August 2001, EastEnders began airing a 4th weekly episode. The storyline to mark the occasion centered around Mel, her husband Steve, his archenemy Phil, and their common nemesis Dan Sullivan (Craig Fairbrass). After Phil and Steve wrongfully framed Dan for Phil's shooting, Dan sought revenge by kidnapping Mel and demanding a ransom. An EastEnders insider reportedly told the Daily Mirror, "This has [been] one of the most dramatic storylines we have ever filmed. Dan has vowed to get even with Phil and Steve for framing him over the shooting. Kidnapping Mel kills two birds with one stone. Although Mel and Phil have had their differences, he still harbors feelings for her." As part of the storyline, Outhwaite, as Mel, was tied up to a radiator in a council flat. Outhwaite commented, "They offered to untie my wrists between scenes, but I said no so I could feel what it was really like. My wrists were raw by the end of it and I was exhausted, but that was the challenge I wanted."

Departure
On 26 July 2001, it was announced that Kemp had decided to leave EastEnders and that he was to move from the BBC to rival station ITV. He said of his decision: "I have had a wonderful time at EastEnders and I will be very sad to leave, but I feel that its time to move on." It was reported that EastEnders producers decided to kill off his character as "revenge" for how the situation was handled. In 2006, Kemp ruled out a return to the show, saying he stayed for too long. However, in 2009, he expressed a wish to return, saying "Working on EastEnders was the best job I ever had. I want the producers to ring me up and get me back on the show. Steve was blown up, but I could come back as his evil twin!" He also said he was happy that he had a dramatic exit.

Reception
Kemp's portrayal of Steve saw him nominated for several awards, many of which he won. He won in the "Most Popular Actor" category at the 2000 National Television Awards and was nominated again the next year. He won "Best Actor" at the Inside Soap Awards in 2001 and "Best Soap Actor" at the TV Quick Awards three years running, from 2000 to 2002. At The British Soap Awards, he was nominated for "Best Actor" and the character for "Villain of the Year" in 1999, winning the latter in 2000. He went on to win "Best Actor" at the 2001 and 2002 ceremonies. Additionally, Steve's car crash was nominated for "Spectacular Scene of the Year" and "Best Exit" in 2002.

See also
List of soap opera villains

References

External links

EastEnders characters
Fictional bartenders
Fictional murderers
Fictional businesspeople
Fictional criminals in soap operas
Television characters introduced in 1998
Male villains
Fictional gangsters
Fictional prisoners and detainees
Male characters in television